Rong Zhen (1891–1960) was a military commander in the Republic of China. He belonged to the Fengtian clique, but eventually participated in the Wang Jingwei regime (Republic of China-Nanjing). He was born in Zaoqiang, Zhili (Hebei).

Biography
In 1912 Rong Zhen entered the Department of the Artillery at the Baoding Military Academy. In November 1914 he graduated, then joined the unit of Fengtian clique's commander Li Jinglin.

In 1926 Rong Zhen was promoted to be commander of the 43rd Brigade of the 1st Division, the Northeast Army, commanded by Zhang Xueliang. In 1927, Rong was promoted to be commander of the 17th Army, and awarded the General of Renwei. In 1928 Rong was appointed Chief of the Military Agency of the Headquarters, Northeast Border Defence Army.

In 1931 Rong Zhen was appointed as the Chief of Staff of the Commander‐in‐Chief's Office of the Northeast Border Defence Army. When the Mukden Incident broke out, he supported Zhang Xueliang. In next August, Rong was transferred to the Executive Member of the Beiping Branch of the Military Committee, the National Government. In 1935 he was promoted to lieutenant general.

In 1943 Rong Zhen became a member of the Military Committee, the Wang Jingwei regime. Concurrently, he held the office of the Chief of the Committee for Subjugation Communists, the North China Political Council  In June 1944, he was transferred to Chief of the Northern Chinese Branch Court of the Special Court. In February 1945, he was appointed Governor of Hebei Province. In April he also became Chief Security Officer at Baoding.

After the Wang Jingwei regime had collapsed, Rong Zhen was arrested by Chiang Kai-shek's National Government. Because of the charge of the treason and surrender to enemy (namely Hanjian), he was sentenced to death on military tribunal for committing treason and surrendering to Japan, But he was not executed. After the foundation of PRC, he was treated as the friend of new government. In 1960, he died in Beijing.

Alma mater

Baoding Military Academy

References

Footnotes 
 

People from Hengshui
National Revolutionary Army generals from Hebei
Kuomintang collaborators with Imperial Japan
Military personnel of the Republic of China in the Second Sino-Japanese War
Chinese collaborators with Imperial Japan
1891 births
Year of death uncertain
Year of death missing